Notable events of 2015 in webcomics.

Events
Randall Munroe of xkcd released a collection of illustrations called Thing Explainer on 24 November, based on his comic "Up Goer Five".
Chris Onstad of the webcomic Achewood resumed to posting new comics on December 24, after 20 months of hiatus.

Awards
Eisner Awards, "Best Digital Comic" won by Brian Vaughan and Marcos Martin's The Private Eye.
Harvey Awards, "Best Online Comics Work" won by Brian Vaughan and Marcos Martin's The Private Eye.
Ignatz Awards, "Outstanding Online Comic" won by Lilli Carré's The Bloody Footprint.
Joe Shuster Awards, "Outstanding Webcomic Creator" won by Nicole Chartrand (Fey Winds).
Reuben Awards, "Online Comics"; Short Form won by Danielle Corsetto's Girls with Slingshots, Long Form won by Minna Sundberg's Stand Still, Stay Silent.
Cartoonist Studio Prize, "Best Web Comic" won by Winston Rowntree's Watching.
Aurora Awards, "Best Graphic Novel" won by Kari Maaren's It Never Rains.
Cybil Awards, "Young Adult Graphic Novel" won by Noelle Stevenson's Nimona.
WEBTOON's Webtoonist Day, "Webtoonist of the Year" won by Oh Seong-dae's Tales of the Unusual.

Webcomics started

 March — Super Secret by eon
 March 5 — Space Boy by Stephen McCranie
 March 6 — ShootAround by suspu
 March 16 — Newman by John Ulrich
 April 1 — Yumi's Cells by Lee Dong-geun
 April 1 — Out-Of-Placers by Valsalia
 April 3 — Never Satisfied by Taylor Robin
 May — Girl's World by Morangg
 May — Fantome-Stein by Beka Duke
 May 14 — How to Love by Alex Norris
 May 15 — Spirit Fingers by Han Kyoung-chal
 April 6 — Sleepless Domain by Mary Cagle
 June 1 — Oh! Holy by Ahyun
 June 24 — Sword Interval by Benjamin Fleuter
 August 31 — Cyberforce by Marc Silvestri
 October — Finnish Nightmares by Karoliina Korhonen
 December 13 — Eggnoid by Archie The RedCat
 December 26 — These Memories Won't Last by Stu Campbell
 Acception by Coco “Colourbee” Ouwerkerk
 Time Prisoners by Bai Xiao
 Urbanlore by Kaveri Gopalakrishnan and Aarthi Parthasarathy

Webcomics ended
 319 Dark Street by David Wade, 2004 – 2015
 Girls With Slingshots by Danielle Corsetto, 2004 – 2015
 The Private Eye by Brian K. Vaughan and Marcos Martín, 2013 – 2015

References

 
Webcomics by year